Papyrus 35 (in the Gregory-Aland numbering), designated by 𝔓35, is an early copy of the New Testament in Greek. It is a papyrus manuscript of the Gospel of Matthew, it contains only Matthew 25:12-15.20-23. The manuscript paleographically has been assigned to the 3rd or 4th century.

Description 

The Greek text of this codex is a representative of the Alexandrian text-type. Aland placed it in Category I.

Aland dated the manuscript to the 4th century, Roberts and T. C. Skeat dated it to the 3rd century.

It is currently housed at the Laurentian Library (PSI 1) in Florence.

See also 

 List of New Testament papyri
 Biblical manuscript
 Papyrus 36

References

Further reading

Images
Images of GA_P35 Florence, Biblioteca Medicea Laurenziana; Shelf Number: P.S.I. 1 at CSNTM

New Testament papyri
4th-century biblical manuscripts
Gospel of Matthew papyri